Maine South  is a townland in the Barony of Orrery and Kilmore in County Cork, Ireland. It is contained within the civil parish of Kilbolane, within the Poor law union of Kanturk, and within the electoral division of Newtown, in the local electoral area of Fermoy. It is located on the R515 road, midway between the villages of Milford and Newtownshandrum.

References 

Townlands of County Cork